Felicia Meyer (1912–1978) was an American painter known for her landscapes, city scenes, and portraits. Her style was realist. She lived part of the year in Manhattan and part in southern Vermont and her paintings depict subjects from both locales. During the 1930s and 1940s her work appeared frequently in group exhibitions and she was given solo exhibitions intermittently between 1942 and 1974. Early in her career a New York critic called her paintings "coherent" and "deeply unified," and after her death the art historian, Lloyd Goodrich, wrote that "her landscapes, with their sense of nature's life, their freshness and delicacy, and their unostentatious skill, were pervaded with a lyrical poetry of a very personal kind."

Early life and education

In the early 1930s Meyer studied in Manhattan at The Finch School and the Art Students League.  At the League her instructors were Kimon Nicolaïdes, Kenneth Hayes Miller, and Guy Pène du Bois.

Artistic career

On completing her art studies she participated in shows held in both Manhattan and Manchester, Vermont. Early in 1932 she participated in a small group exhibition held at the G.R.D. Gallery in Manhattan, that summer she contributed paintings to a large group exhibition held by the Southern Vermont Artists Association in Manchester, and at the end of the year her work appeared in a group exhibition at the Jumble Shop gallery. In the succeeding years of the 1930s Meyer regularly contributed paintings to exhibitions in Manhattan and Manchester.  Early in 1935 she showed at a gallery run by the National Association of Women Artists in a group of former League students that included Dean Fausett, Horace Day, Fairfield Porter, and Elizabeth Nottingham and later that year showed again in the annual exhibition held by Southern Vermont artists.

During the 1940s, critics rarely noticed her paintings in group shows, but she received attention for solo exhibitions in 1942 (at the Wakefield Gallery) and 1944 (at the Macbeth Gallery). In 1957, 1969, and 1974 her paintings appeared in solo shows at the Frank K.M. Rehn Gallery.

Over the course of her career Meyer came to be known best for her landscapes of the Vermont locale where she spent the summer months. Her 1940 painting, "Vermont Hillside," (shown at left) is typical of these landscapes. She was also known for depictions of the New York locale where she spent the cooler months. Her painting, "Cocktails on the Terrace" (shown at right) is typical of these. She was also known for her floral still lifes, such as the one shown at left and figure studies, such as the self portrait shown at right.

Artistic practice

Meyer usually painted in oil on canvas.

Personal life

Meyer was an only child, daughter of the artists Herbert William Meyer and Anne Norton Meyer. In 1934 she married the artist Reginald Marsh. The couple had no children.

Notes

References

20th-century American women artists
1912 births
1978 deaths
20th-century American painters
American women painters
Painters from New York City
Painters from Vermont
Art Students League of New York alumni